Queenie Mary Allen (December 1911 — 2 August 2007), later Queenie Webber, was an English badminton player from the 1930s into 1950s. She won the women's doubles title at the All England Open Badminton Championships in 1949 with Betty Uber. She also won international competitions in Denmark, Scotland, South Africa, Ireland, and France.

Career
Allen competed in the 1934 All England Badminton Championships. At the 1948 South African Badminton Championships, Allen won in the women's doubles category, with her partner Betty Uber. In 1947, 1948, and 1949, she won the women's singles category at the Irish Open; she also won the women's doubles category at the Irish Open in 1947 and 1949 with Betty Uber, and the mixed doubles category in 1949 with Harold Marsland. She won the women's singles category at the Scottish Open in 1948, 1949, and 1950; she also won the women's doubles category at the Scottish Open with Betty Uber in 1948, 1949, 1950, 1951, and 1953. At the French Open, she won the mixed doubles title with Malaysian player Eddy Choong in 1951 and 1952, and the ladies doubles title with Audrey Stone in 1951.

At the 1949 All England Badminton Championships, Allen won in the women's doubles category, with her partner Betty Uber, and finished as a runnerup in the mixed doubles category, with her partner T. Wynn Rogers. At the 1951 All England Badminton Championships, Queenie Webber (using her married name) finished as a runnerup in the women's doubles category, with her partner Mavis Henderson.

She played in the first badminton games broadcast on television in the United Kingdom, and her colleague recalled, "We had been told that white did not televise well, so that we must all wear colours no matter what they were. Queenie wore a blue skirt and yellow shirt, and I wore a black skirt and red-and-white shirt."

Singing
Queenie Allen-Webber was also a contralto singer. She performed in concert at Wigmore Hall in 1955.

Personal life
Queenie Allen married F. G. Webber. She died at a rest home in Sussex in 2007, aged 95 years.

Career wins

References

English female badminton players
1911 births
2007 deaths